The Trans-Sahelian Highway or TAH 5 is a transnational highway project to pave, improve and ease border formalities on a highway route through the southern fringes of the Sahel region in West Africa between Dakar, Senegal in the west and Ndjamena, Chad, in the east. Alternative names for the highway are the Dakar-Ndjamena Highway or Ndjamena-Dakar Highway and it is Trans-African Highway 5 in the Trans-African Highway network.

The highway passes through seven countries and five national capitals, and links regions of similar climate and environment which have cultural and trade links going back centuries.

Route and status

Overall features, length and condition
The Trans-Sahelian Highway has a length of about  running through Senegal, Mali, Burkina Faso, Niger, Nigeria, and the far northern tip of Cameroon, ending at N'Djamena just inside the western border of Chad. Most of the route uses existing national highways, but an optional route requires construction of a completely new road between Senegal and Mali.

Detail of sections
The cities and countries served, and status of the road are as follows (going east):
In Senegal, Dakar to Tambacounda, paved,  in poor condition; this road has been paved for several decades.
Linking Senegal and Mali between Tambacounda and Bamako, two options were proposed in the 2005 consultants' report
a longer northern route of about  via Kayes, Diéma and Didjeni, utilising national roads of Mali which are paved.
In south-eastern Mail, Bamako to Sikasso via Bougouni, paved before 1990 and in fair condition.
Sikasso to Koloko at the Burkina Faso border, paved and in fair condition.
Burkina Faso section:  via Bobo-Dioulasso, Ouagadougou, Koupéla, and Fada Ngourma, paved and in good condition except for  paved section before the Niger border, due to be rehabilitated in 2003–5;
Nigeria section: , all paved and in fair condition, via Katsina, Kano, Kari, Maiduguri and Dikwa.
The short Cameroon section consists of an  unpaved gravel road from the Nigerian border to Maltam which is impassable in the wet season; as this road is not used by local traffic to any extent, Cameroon has no plans to upgrade it. The  section from Maltam to Kousseri at the Chad border is paved and is used mainly by Chadian traffic.
Chad: the highway is fairly complete except for the last 150 km from Abeche to the Sudanese border town of Adre and a small gap within the city limits of Mongo. It is in need of some maintenance in some areas as the surface has become broken up.  There is regular bus service from the capital NDjamena to Abeche every day.

Alternative routes at the eastern end:
Nguigmi is connected by a paved road via Zinder to Maradi where it meets the Trans-Sahelian Highway.

Links to other transnational highways
The Trans-Sahelian Highway intersects with the following Trans-African Highways:
  in Dakar
  in Dakar
  in Kano, Nigeria

The northern regions of Guinea, Côte d'Ivoire, Ghana, Togo, and Benin are close to the Trans-Sahelian Highway, which may be used to by travellers between those regions in preference to the Trans–West African Coastal Highway further south. Paved roads connect the Trans-Sahelian and West African Coastal Highways through
 Côte d'Ivoire (Sikassa or Bobo-Dioulasso to Yamoussoukro)
Ghana (Ouagadougou to Accra)
Togo (Koupela to Lomé)
Benin (Dosso to Cotonou)
Nigeria (Birnin-Konni or Kano to Lagos).

See also

 Trans–West African Coastal Highway
 Trans-Sahara Highway
 Trans-African Highway network

References

 African Development Bank/United Nations Economic Commission For Africa: "Review of the Implementation Status of the Trans African Highways and the Missing Links: Volume 2: Description of Corridors". August 14, 2003. Retrieved 14 July 2007. 
Michelin Motoring and Tourist Map: "Africa North and West". Michelin Travel Publications, Paris, 2000.

5